Sead or seads or variation, may refer to:

SEAD
 Sead (name), a Bosnian male given name; from a variation on Sa'id/Sayed
 Suppression of Enemy Air Defenses (SEAD), a military tactic

SEADS
 Southeast Air Defense Sector (SEADS), NORAD, NORTHCOM, NATO; a sector operated by the U.S. Air Force
 Seattle Air Defense Sector (SeADS), NORAD, NORTHCOM, NATO; a sector operated by the U.S. Air Force
 Space Ecologies Art and Designs (SEADS), a multinational transdisciplinary art collective founded by Angelo Vermeulen

See also

 Deap Seads, a 2017 art exhibition by HULA (artist)
 Baltimore, County Cork, Ireland
 
 Seyd
 Seed (disambiguation)
 Seid (disambiguation)
 Sad (disambiguation)
 Sed (disambiguation)
 SADS (disambiguation)
 SEDS